The Little Sisters is an informal name for a group of some of the smaller islands of the British Virgin Islands, south of Tortola and southwest of Virgin Gorda. These islands are also called the Southern Islands.

Norman Island
Pelican Island
Peter Island
Salt Island
Cooper Island
Ginger Island
Carvel Rock
Dead Chest Island

Also included in the group are several smaller rocky outcroppings.

The closest thing to a formal endorsement of the term occurs in the Labour Code, 2010 (a British Virgin Islands statute) which includes a reference and statutory definition for the "Sister Islands", which the Code defines as meaning 'the islands of the Virgin Islands other than Tortola'.

Gallery

Footnotes

Islands of the British Virgin Islands